Sahil Khan is an Indian actor, fitness entrepreneur and YouTuber. He is known for increasing fitness awareness, and has won awards from several bodies in Mumbai. His YouTube channel has over 2.8 million subscribers.

He is also associated with the water brand Hunk Water.

Career
Khan started his career with a musical video of Stereo Nation Nachange Sari Raat. N. Chandra signed him to play the lead role in his film Style. The film went on to become a box office success. Immediately thereafter, the sequel to Style, Xcuse Me, also went on in the comedy genre. He also starred in Aladin and Ramaa: The Saviour.

Filmography

Personal life
Khan married Negar Khan on 21 September 2003. They divorced in July 2005.

Controversies
Khan allegedly had an affair with Ayesha Shroff in 2009 when the two started a production company together.
The alleged relationship of the two and their business partnership took an ugly shape later in 2014 when she filed a legal case against him. In return, the actor's lawyer submitted some intimate photos to the court, which showed both Khan and Shroff in a compromising situation, implying there was much more than just professional commitment between the two.

In 2014, Khan was involved in a gym fight with Bollywood actor Sana Khan's alleged boyfriend Ismail Khan. Reportedly, Ismail attacked Sahil unexpectedly in a Mumbai based gym over a business contract delay causing this feud. Also apparently starting rumours by Sahil about Sana Khan and Ismail's relationship but this is denied by Sahil.

References

External links
 Khan's official website
 
 

Indian male film actors
Living people
Male actors from Kolkata
Male actors from Delhi
Year of birth missing (living people)
Date of birth missing (living people)